Annie Ida Jenny Noë Haesendonck (born 13 April 1959) is a Belgian football coach and former international goalkeeper. She won  59 caps for the Belgium women's national football team between 1979 and 1994. When playing for the women's national team, Noë had to wear Jean-Marie Pfaff's old shirts. She stopped playing when she was 35 years old, then became a coach with the Royal Belgian Football Association. In 1999 she was appointed head coach of the national team.

References

External links
 Profile at Royal Belgian Football Association 
 Profile at Katholieke Universiteit Leuven

1959 births
Living people
Belgian women's footballers
Belgium women's international footballers
Belgian football managers
Women's association football managers
Standard Liège (women) players
Footballers from Flemish Brabant
Academic staff of KU Leuven
Women's association football goalkeepers
Sint-Truidense V.V. (women) players
Belgium women's national football team managers
Female association football managers
Sportspeople from Leuven